A list of films produced in Brazil in 1938:

See also
 1938 in Brazil

External links
Brazilian films of 1938 at the Internet Movie Database

Lists of 1938 films by country or language
1938
Films